Edward B. Branson was an American geologist and paleontologist. He was a professor of geology at the University of Missouri.

Overview of career 
Branson earned his doctorate at the University of Chicago and joined the Geology department at the University of Missouri in 1911. During his doctoral studies, he had spent time searching for fossils near Lander, Wyoming and so he determined to set up a camp for the hands-on study of geology and paleontology nearby. Also in 1911, he came to Lander with a group of students and established the Missouri Field Geology Camp, which is now known as the Branson Field Laboratory, near Sinks Canyon State Park. The Branson Field Laboratory appears to be the oldest continually operated field geology camp in the United States. Eventually Branson formed a scientific partnership with Maurice "Doc" Mehl, another Chicago graduate who joined the Missouri faculty in 1919. Branson retired in 1948, which is when the camp was renamed in his honor.

Contributions 
In 1915, he wrote a paper on the origin of thick gypsum and salt deposits.

In 1931, he and Mehl described the extinct genus of heterostracan agnathan Cardipeltis in the Jefferson Formation of Utah.

in 1932, Branson and Mehl reported the presence of Carboniferous-aged fossil footprints of a new ichnospecies in the Tensleep Formation of Wyoming. They named the tracks Steganoposaurus belli and attributed them to an amphibian nearly three feet in length.
The same year, he and Mehl named a new kind of Late Triassic dinosaur footprint discovered in the Popo Agie Formation of western Wyoming. The new ichnogenus and species was named Agialopus wyomingensis.

In 1933, also with Mehl, he described the conodont species Wurmiella excavata.

In 1934, with Mehl, he described the conodont genera Pseudopolygnathus and Ancyrognathus.

In 1938, with Mehl, he reviewed the conodont genus Icriodus.

In 1941, he and  Mehl described several conodont genera: Bactrognathus, Doliognathus, Scaliognathus, Staurognathus and Taphrognathus.
Also in 1941, with C.C. Branson, he reviewed the geology of the Wind River Mountains in Wyoming.

In 1944, he described with  Mehl the conodont genus Siphonodella.

In 1947, with C.C. Branson, he reviewed the Lower Silurian conodonts from Kentucky.

In 1951, with Mehl and C.C. Branson, he published an article about the Richmond Group conodonts of Kentucky and Indiana.

See also 
 20th century in ichnology
 Paleontology in Wyoming

References 

American paleontologists
Conodont specialists
Year of birth missing
Year of death missing
20th-century American geologists
20th-century American zoologists
University of Missouri faculty